1872 election  may refer to:
1872 United States presidential election
United States House of Representatives elections, 1872